At the Beeb is a live album by the British rock band Queen, released on vinyl, cassette tape, and CD in 1989. It was released by Hollywood Records in 1995 in the United States and Canada under the title At the BBC on CD and as limited edition picture disc vinyl.

The album comprises tracks recorded in two sessions for the BBC Radio 1 Sound of the 70s programme. The first four tracks were recorded on 5 February 1973; the rest were recorded on 3 December 1973.

All but one track appeared on the album Queen; the exception is "Ogre Battle" which appeared on Queen II. All these tracks would later be released on the 2016 album On Air along with other session recordings.

Track listing

Chart performance
In 1989, At the Beeb debuted at #67 in the United Kingdom.

References

Queen (band) compilation albums
At the Beeb (Queen album)
1989 compilation albums
Hollywood Records albums